This article presents a list of notable events of 2016 in webcomics.

Events

On April Fools' Day, a large group of webcomic artists published their own version of the same four-panel webcomic, satirizing debates on unoriginality and joke-theft.
In December, Chris Onstad puts Achewood on hiatus again indefinitely.

Awards
Eisner Awards, "Best Digital/Webcomic" won by Paul Tobin and Colleen Coover's Bandette.
Harvey Awards, "Best Online Comics Work" won by Mike Norton's Battlepug.
Ignatz Award, "Outstanding Online Comic" won by Meredith Gran's Octopus Pie.
Reuben Awards, "Online Comics"; Short Form won by Dave Kellett's Sheldon, Long Form won by Drew Weing's The Creepy Case Files of Margo Maloo.
Cartoonist Studio Prize, "Best Web Comic" won by Boulet's I Want to Believe.

Webcomics started

 January — Les Culottées by Pénélope Bagieu
 January 18 — As Per Usual by Dami Lee
 January 22 — Nano List by Min Song-ah
 March — Siren's Lament by instantmiso
 March 12 — Apocalyptic Horseplay by Boredman
 March 17 — Teen Mom by TheTerm
 March 18–December 16 — Helios:Femina by Michelle Phan
 April 5–September 27 — The Red Hook by Dean Haspiel
 April 8 — My ID is Gangnam Beauty by Gi Maeng-gi
 April 21 — Overwatch digital comics series by James Waugh
 May 13 — Lady of the Shard by Gigi D.G.
 May 13 — Dents by Beth Behrs, Matt Doyle & Sid Kotian
 May 24 — unOrdinary by uruchan
 May 31 — SUPERPOSE by Seosamh & Anka
 June 17 — Ghost Wife by Saejung
 June 25 — Brown Paperbag by Sailesh Gopalan
 July 15 — Otokonoko Zuma by Crystal na Yousuke
 July 26 — Webcomic Name by Alex Norris
 October 28 — Hello World! by Alex Norris
 November 15 — Adventures of God by Teo and Corey
 December 1 — Firebrand by Jessica Chobot and Erika Lewis

Webcomics ended
 Homestuck by Andrew Hussie, 2009 – 2016
 Battlepug by Mike Norton, 2011 – 2016
 Girls of the Wild's by Hun and Zhena, 2011 – 2016
 Soul Cartel by Kim Eun-hyo and Kim Yeong-ji, 2012 – 2016
 Henchgirl by Kristen Gudsnuk, 2013 – 2016
 Bastard by Kim Carnby and Hwang Young-chan, 2014 – 2016
 Demon by Jason Shiga, 2014 – 2016
 Cyberforce by Marc Silvestri, 2015 – 2016
 How to Love by Alex Norris, 2015 – 2016

References

 
Webcomics by year